Bos palaesondaicus occurred on Pleistocene Java (Indonesia) and belongs to the Bovinae subfamily. It has been described by the Dutch paleoanthropologist Eugène Dubois in 1908. The holotype of Bos palaesondaicus is a skull from Trinil. This species is the likely ancestor to the banteng (Bos javanicus).

References

Bovines
Extinct animals of Indonesia
Bos, palaesondaicus
Bos, palaesondaicus
Bos, Palaesondaicus
Mammals described in 1908
Fossil taxa described in 1908